Nate Broe Hobgood-Chittick (November 30, 1974 – November 11, 2017) was an American football defensive tackle who played four seasons in the National Football League (NFL). He was signed as an undrafted free agent by the New York Giants, and spent time with the Indianapolis Colts, St. Louis Rams, San Francisco 49ers, and Kansas City Chiefs.

Career 
Hobgood-Chittick attended William Allen High School in Allentown, Pennsylvania and played college football at the University of North Carolina, where he received a full collegiate football scholarship.

At North Carolina, Hobgood-Chittick was roommates with teammate Jeff Saturday, and later recalled that "Jeff kicked our asses all over the practice field. I could count on one hand the number of times I beat him in a one-on-one drill, and if it happened, I celebrated." Hobgood-Chittick later brought Saturday to the attention of the Indianapolis Colts during the 1998 season, saying: I had no footing at all with that franchise, so I stood outside Bill Polian's door in my dirty sweats, saying a prayer. I walked in and said, "There's a guy selling electrical supplies in Raleigh right now who whipped all those first-round draft choices at North Carolina every day." Polian looked at me and said, "I love it. Let's get him in here for a workout." 

Saturday went on to be selected to six Pro Bowls over his NFL career, and win Super Bowl XLI. Hobgood-Chittick also  was a member of the St. Louis Rams team that won Super Bowl XXXIV over the Tennessee Titans.

Later life 
Upon retiring, Hobgood-Chittick earned his Master's degree in social work from Cal State-Long Beach, and became a financial advisor. He died of a heart attack on November 11, 2017 at age 42.

References

External links
Biography and statistics at Just Sports Stats

1974 births
2017 deaths
Players of American football from New Haven, Connecticut
American football defensive tackles
North Carolina Tar Heels football players
New York Giants players
Indianapolis Colts players
St. Louis Rams players
San Francisco 49ers players
Kansas City Chiefs players
William Allen High School alumni